German submarine U-1279 was a Type VIIC/41 U-boat of Nazi Germany's Kriegsmarine during World War II.

She was ordered on 13 June 1942, and was laid down on 26 August 1943, at Bremer Vulkan AG, Bremen, as yard number 74. She was commissioned under the command of Oberleutnant zur See Hans Falke on 5 July 1944.

Design
German Type VIIC/41 submarines were preceded by the heavier Type VIIC submarines. U-1279 had a displacement of  when at the surface and  while submerged. She had two shafts and two  propellers.

U-1279 was fitted with five  torpedo tubes (four fitted at the bow and one at the stern), fourteen torpedoes, one  SK C/35 naval gun, (220 rounds), one  Flak M42 and two  C/30 anti-aircraft guns. The boat had a complement of between forty-four and fifty-two.

Service history
U-1279 left on her first and only war patrol on 29 January 1945. At this time she was, and probably had been prior to, fitted with a Schnorchel underwater-breathing apparatus. She was sunk on 27 February 1945 by depth charges, killing all 48 of her crew.

See also
 Battle of the Atlantic

Notes 

Citations

Bibliography 

Books

Online sources

External links

German Type VIIC/41 submarines
U-boats commissioned in 1944
U-boats sunk in 1945
World War II submarines of Germany
1944 ships
World War II shipwrecks in the English Channel
Ships built in Bremen (state)
Maritime incidents in February 1945
U-boats sunk by depth charges